The Oregon–Washington football rivalry is an American college football rivalry between the Oregon Ducks and Washington Huskies of the Pac-12 Conference.

It is one of the most played rivalries in NCAA Division I FBS history, and has been played regularly

Series history

Early years
The series opened in 1900, with Oregon dominating Washington 43-0 in Eugene.

The rivalry became heated from Oregon's perspective in 1948, when Oregon and California both went undefeated in the Pacific Coast Conference. California was undefeated overall, and Oregon's only loss was at undefeated Michigan, that year's national champions, and the Ducks had seven victories in the PCC to Cal's six. The winner of the PCC, as is today with the Pac-12, played in the Rose Bowl. Oregon, led by quarterback Norm Van Brocklin and halfback John McKay, opted for a playoff game, but California declined. The tiebreaker format the PCC elected to use was that the championship team be elected by the schools. The PCC had ten member schools in 1948, six in the Northwest (with Idaho and Montana) and four in California, so it was assumed that Oregon would be the team playing in the Rose Bowl, as even a  vote would be in their favor. Instead California was voted champion of the PCC, because Washington had persuaded Montana to vote for California, something that has not been forgotten by Oregon fans. (The PCC allowed a second bowl team that season and Oregon went to the Cotton Bowl, but lost 21–13 to hometown SMU in Dallas. California lost to twice-beaten Northwestern by six points in the Rose Bowl.)

1950s and 1960s
All-Pacific Coast Conference fullback Hugh McElhenny and the Huskies ran up the score on Oregon, 63-6 in 1951 in what was at the time the most lopsided score of the series.

In 1962, Larry Hill of Oregon was tackled by Washington fans who had rushed onto the field at Husky Stadium while he was trying to catch the tie-breaking touchdown on the game's final play.

1970s and 1980s
In 1973, the Ducks exceeded the 57 point loss margin that the Huskies had inflicted on them in 1951 with a 58-0 shutout in Eugene. The following season, the Huskies returned the favor, shutting out the Ducks 66-0 in Seattle.

From 1974 through 1986, the Huskies won 12 of 13 games against the Ducks.

1990s and later
In 1995, Washington head coach Jim Lambright unsuccessfully lobbied for the Huskies to be selected to play in the Cotton Bowl instead of the Ducks. Seattle Post Intelligencer columnist Bud Withers wrote that Lambright's actions "invited at least another half-century worth of bile from Oregon fans."

After winning four of six over Lambright in the 1990s, the rivalry was given another boost in Oregon eyes when Colorado head coach Rick Neuheisel moved to Washington in 1999. Oregon coach Mike Bellotti was also accused of turning Neuheisel in for recruiting during the dead period. The Ducks were 1–2 against the Huskies under Neuheisel, and the rivalry grew even more when Neuheisel celebrated by taking photos and jumping up and down on the "O" in the middle of the field after a win at Autzen Stadium  Two years earlier, the Ducks' victory in 2000 in Eugene spoiled an otherwise undefeated season for the Huskies, who won the Rose Bowl and finished third in  Due to Pac-10 scheduling, the teams did not meet in 2001, the first break in the rivalry since the hiatus in 1943 and 1944 due to 

From 2004 through 2015, the Ducks won 12 straight games against the Huskies, the longest streak of the series for either team.

Through 2021, Washington leads . The Huskies went  from 1972 to 1993 (mostly under Don James,  but Oregon then went  from 1994 through 2015.  The Ducks won 12 straight from 2004 to 2015, the longest run by either team in the series; the closest margin was six points  in 2015.  in 2016 when the fifth-ranked Huskies won  in Eugene, a game that set series scoring records for one team (70 points) and  Washington followed it up with a  home win  Oregon ended their 2-game losing streak in the series in 2018 with a 30–27 overtime win over Washington in Eugene, the first overtime game in the rivalry's history. In the 2019 rendition in Seattle, the Ducks came back from a 14-point deficit in the 2nd half to prevail 35–31 over the Huskies. It was the 2nd consecutive meeting in which both teams were ranked, and 7th all-time. The 2020 game was canceled due to increasing COVID-19 cases in the Washington football program.

Notable events after 1990

The Pick
Arguably the most iconic moment in the history of the rivalry for Ducks fans happened in 1994, when Oregon freshman cornerback Kenny Wheaton intercepted Washington quarterback Damon Huard and returned the ball 97 yards for a touchdown with under a minute to play to seal a 31–20 upset win that snapped a five-game losing streak in the series for the Ducks and set them on course for what would become their first conference championship (and trip to the Rose Bowl) since 1957.  This play, coined "The Pick", is widely credited as the turning point for the Oregon football program on their way to becoming nationally relevant in the decades that followed.  It also swung momentum in the rivalry that was until then mostly dominated by the Huskies 54-28-5, with Oregon notching a 17–4 record against Washington from The Pick until the end of The Streak.  Just before kickoff of every Ducks home game, a replay of "The Pick" is shown on the Autzen Stadium video board, always accompanied by a loud and gleeful reaction.

The Streak
Oregon beat Washington in 12 straight games from 2004–2015, the largest winning streak in the rivalry.

This streak correlated with Oregon's most successful era of football and Washington's least. The Ducks went 120–36 over these 12 seasons, with two national championship game appearances, four conference titles, two Rose Bowl victories, and a Heisman Trophy winner. Meanwhile, the Huskies went 62–88 including a winless 0–12 in 2008.

The Point + 70

The Huskies finally snapped their losing streak in 2016 with a dominating 70–21 win over the Ducks in Eugene. This was the first time an opponent had scored 70 points in Autzen Stadium's history, and the first time an Oregon team had allowed 70 points or more in a game since a 71-7 loss to the Texas Longhorns in 1941. The 2016 Huskies would go on to finish the regular season 12–1, win the Pac-12 Championship, and face Alabama in the CFP semifinal Peach Bowl. Their win vs. Oregon was seen as a major realignment in the power ranking of the Pac-12 North. In contrast to the Huskies, Oregon would go on to finish the season 4-8, resulting in head coach Mark Helfrich being fired at the end of the season.

On the game's first play from scrimmage, Ducks quarterback Justin Herbert, making his first college start, was intercepted by Huskies cornerback Budda Baker. Four plays later, QB Jake Browning scored the first of the Huskies' ten touchdowns on a 1-yard run. As he crossed the goal line Browning pointed his left index finger at trailing linebacker Jimmie Swain, who was clad in a throwback blue and yellow Oregon Webfoots jersey. This gesture became known as The Point after sideline photographs of the play went viral across social media during and after the game.

"Academically prowess teams" 
On November 1, 2021, Huskies head coach Jimmy Lake was asked by the media if he considered Oregon to be a recruiting rival on the Monday leading up to the game against Oregon.

The comments drew controversy and ridicule throughout the week, renewing the rivalry once more, especially in the wake of the 2020 game being cancelled due to the COVID-19 pandemic.

Oregon would win the game, 26-16. With 1:58 remaining in the 4th quarter down 24-16 and possession of the ball, Washington elected to punt the ball away on 4th and 10. The snap instead sailed high above punter Race Porter, resulting in a safety for Oregon to seal the game.

The day after the game on November 7, 2021, Lake fired offensive coordinator John Donovan. Additionally, Lake had been involved in a sideline altercation with redshirt freshman linebacker Ruperake Fuavai. Washington athletic director Jennifer Cohen conducted a 24 hour investigation and then announced that Lake would be suspended without pay for the game against Arizona State.

On November 14, 2021, Washington fired Lake without cause. He was owed a $9.9 million buyout.

Game results

 Oregon's home games against Washington were played in Portland from 1911–1913 and 1926–1965.

Coaching records
Since 1945

Oregon

Washington

 Last tie was in 1962, overtime began in 1996 in Division I-A (one, 2018)
 Two games were played in 1945; not scheduled in 2001, canceled (COVID-19) in 2020

See also 
 List of NCAA college football rivalry games
 List of most-played college football series in NCAA Division I

References

College football rivalries in the United States
Oregon Ducks football
Washington Huskies football
1900 establishments in Oregon
1900 establishments in Washington (state)